The Portraits World Tour was the second headlining concert tour by American singer Greyson Chance in support of his second studio album, Portraits. The tour began on July 11, 2019, in Seattle and concluded on January 31, 2020, in Chicago.

Background and development
On June 10, 2019, Chance announced he would be embarking on a six-month world tour. Additional European dates were added due to high demand. Chance added additional European dates on December 11.

Setlist 
This setlist is representative of the show on October 9, 2019, in Ghent. It does not represent all the shows from the tour.

"West Texas"
"Bleed You Still"
"Seasons Nineteen"
"Timekeeper"
"Overloved"
"Good as Gold"
"Black on Black"
"Back on the Wall"
"Yours"
"Lakeshore"
"Low"
"Stand"
"Shut Up"
"White Roses"

Tour dates

References

2019 concert tours
2020 concert tours